Moneaksekar Khmer (lit. "Khmer’s Conscience") is a Khmer-language newspaper published in Cambodia with its headquarters in Phnom Penh. It is published by the Sam Rainsy party.

Khmer-language newspapers
Newspapers published in Cambodia
Mass media in Phnom Penh
Publications with year of establishment missing